Dichloroanilines are chemical compounds which consist of an aniline ring substituted with two chlorine atoms and have the molecular formula C6H5Cl2N.  There are six isomers, varying in the positions of the chlorine atoms around the ring relative to the amino group.  As aniline derivatives, they are named with the amino group in position 1.  They are all colorless, although commercial samples can appear colored due to the presence of impurities.  Several derivatives are used in the production of dyes and herbicides.

References

Anilines